Music can be analysed by considering a variety of its elements, or parts (aspects, characteristics, features), individually or together. A commonly used list of the main elements includes pitch, timbre, texture, volume, duration, and form. The elements of music may be compared to the elements of art or design.

Selection of elements

According to Howard Gardner, there is little dispute about the principal constituent elements of music, though experts differ on their precise definitions. Harold Owen bases his list on the qualities of sound: pitch, timbre, intensity, and duration while John Castellini excludes duration. Gordon C. Bruner II follows the line of temporal-based deductions in association with musical composition, denoting music's primary components as "time, pitch, and texture." Most definitions of music include a reference to sound and sound perception can be divided into six cognitive processes. They are: pitch, duration, loudness, timbre, sonic texture and spatial location.

A 'parameter' is any element that can be manipulated (composed) separately from other elements or focused on separately in an educational context. Leonard B. Meyer compares distinguishing parameters within a culture by their different constraints to distinguishing independent parameters within music, such as melody, harmony, timbre, "etc." The first person to apply the term parameter to music may have been Joseph Schillinger, though its relative popularity may be due to Werner Meyer-Eppler. Gradation is gradual change within one parameter, or an overlapping of two blocks of sound.

Meyer lists melody, rhythm, timbre, harmony, "and the like" as principal elements of music, while Narmour lists melody, harmony, rhythm, dynamics, tessitura, timbre, tempo, meter, texture, "and perhaps others". According to McClellan, two things should be considered, the quality or state of an element and its change over time. Alan P. Merriam proposed a theoretical research model that assumes three aspects are always present in musical activity: concept, behaviour, and sound. Virgil Thomson lists the "raw materials" of music in order of their supposed discovery: rhythm, melody, and harmony; including counterpoint and orchestration. Near the end of the twentieth century music scholarship began to give more attention to social and physical elements of music. For example: performance, social, gender, dance, and theatre.

Definition of music

Does the definition of music determine its aspects, or does the combination of certain aspects determine the definition of music? For example, intensional definitions list aspects or elements that make up their subject.

Some definitions refer to music as a score, or a composition:) music can be read as well as heard, and a piece of music written but never played is a piece of music notwithstanding. According to Edward E. Gordon the process of reading music, at least for trained musicians, involves a process, called "inner hearing" or "audiation", where the music is heard in the mind as if it were being played. This suggests that while sound is often considered a required aspect of music, it might not be.

Jean Molino points out that "any element belonging to the total musical fact can be isolated, or taken as a strategic variable of musical production." Nattiez gives as examples Mauricio Kagel's Con Voce [with voice], where a masked trio silently mimes playing instruments. In this example sound, a common element, is excluded, while gesture, a less common element, is given primacy. However Nattiez goes on to say that despite special cases where sound is not immediately obvious (because it is heard in the mind): "sound is a minimal condition of the musical fact".

Universal aspect

There is disagreement about whether some aspects of music are universal, as well as whether the concept of music is universal. This debate often hinges on definitions. For instance, the fairly common assertion that "tonality" is a universal of all music may necessarily require an expansive definition of tonality. A pulse is sometimes taken as a universal, yet there exist solo vocal and instrumental genres with free and improvisational rhythm--no regular pulse--one example being the alap section of an Indian classical music performance. Harwood questions whether a "cross-cultural musical universal" may be found in the music or in the making of music, including performance, hearing, conception, and education.

One aspect that is important to bear in mind when examining multi-cultural associations is that an English-language word (i.e. the word "music"), not a universal concept, is the object of scrutiny. For this reason it is important to approach apparently equivalent words in other languages with caution. Based on the many disparate definitions that can be found just in English language dictionaries,) it seems there is no agreement on what the word "music" means in English, let alone determining a potentially equivalent word from another culture.

Kenneth Gourlay describes how, since different cultures include different elements in their definitions of music, dance, and related concepts, translation of the words for these activities may split or combine them, citing Nigerian musicologist Chinyere Nwachukwu's definition of the Igbo term "nkwa" as an activity combining and/or requiring singing, playing musical instruments, and dancing. He then concludes that there exists "nonuniversality of music and the universality of nonmusic".

Other terms
Other terms used to discuss particular pieces include:
 Note—an abstraction that refers to either a specific pitch or rhythm, or the written symbol
Chord—a simultaneity of notes heard as some sort of unit
Chord progression—a succession of chords (simultaneity succession)

For a more comprehensive list of terms see: Outline of music

See also

Combinatoriality
New musicology
Noise in music
Permutation (music)
Philosophy of music
Process music
Serialism
Set (music)
Sound art

References

Sources

 
 
 
 
 
 
 
 
 
 
 
 
 
 
 

Further reading
Agricola, Martin (1991). The Rudiments of Music, new edition, translated from the Latin edition of 1539 by John Trowell. Aberystwyth: Boethius Press. 
 American National Standards Institute, "American National Psychoacoustical Terminology". [N.p.]: American Standards Association
Macpherson, Stewart, and Anthony Payne (1970). The Rudiments of Music, revised edition, with a new chapter by Anthony Payne. London: Stainer & Bell; New York: Galliard. .
Ottman, Robert W., and Frank D. Mainous (2000). Rudiments of Music, second edition. Englewood Cliffs, NJ: Prentice-Hall. .
 White, John D. (1976). The Analysis of Music. Englewood Cliffs, New Jersey: Prentice-Hall. .

External links

The Elements of Music

 
Musical analysis
Musical composition
Philosophy of music
Serialism

de:Universalien der Musikwahrnehmung